Monte Alfeo is a mountain in the Ligurian Apennine, located in the territory of the commune of Ottone, province of Piacenza, central Italy, in the left bank of the Val Trebbia. Having an altitude of 1,651 m, it is part of the Monte Antola group.

It has the appearance of a large, isolated pyramid, with slopes covered by forests.

External links
 Page at summitpost.org
 Monte Alfeo slopes webcam (1,260 m)

Mountains of Emilia-Romagna
Mountains of the Apennines
One-thousanders of Italy